Lacera vinacea is a moth of the family Erebidae. It is found in New Caledonia.

References

Moths described in 1979
Lacera
Moths of Oceania